Karkul-e Kasan (also Romanized as Karkūl-e Kasān; also known as Karkūl and Korkūl) is a village in Gowavar Rural District, Govar District, Gilan-e Gharb County, Kermanshah Province, Iran. At the 2006 census, its population was 291, in 60 families.

References 

Populated places in Gilan-e Gharb County